Steven McCarthy is a Canadian actor and filmmaker from Sault Ste. Marie, Ontario. He is most noted for his three-time guest role as Morgan in the television series Mary Kills People, for which he won the Canadian Screen Award for Best Performance in a Guest Role in a Drama Series at the 6th Canadian Screen Awards in 2018.

He attended the National Theatre School of Canada on two separate occasions, studying acting in the 1990s and directing in the 2000s. His first major directing project was a production of Olivier Choinière's play Bliss for Buddies in Bad Times in 2012.

His other roles have included the films Eye of the Beholder, An Insignificant Harvey, Citizen Gangster, Picture Day, and O Negative, and episodes of the television series Degrassi: The Next Generation, Good Dog, Good God, Defiance, Copper, The Strain, Crawford, The Expanse, and Barkskins.

He was the co-writer of We Forgot to Break Up, and the writer and director of O Negative.

He and Amanda Brugel received a Canadian Screen Award nomination for Best Host in a Web Program or Series at the 10th Canadian Screen Awards in 2022, for their cohosting of the 2021 Canadian Alliance of Film and Television Costume Arts and Design awards.

Filmography

References

External links

21st-century Canadian male actors
21st-century Canadian screenwriters
21st-century Canadian male writers
Canadian male film actors
Canadian male screenwriters
Canadian male stage actors
Canadian male television actors
Canadian theatre directors
Canadian Screen Award winners
Male actors from Ontario
Film directors from Ontario
Writers from Ontario
People from Sault Ste. Marie, Ontario
National Theatre School of Canada alumni
Living people
Year of birth missing (living people)